Tiroi Komuter station is a KTM Komuter train station located next to the small housing estate of Taman Tiroi, Negeri Sembilan, on the 7th kilometre of Jalan Labu. The Komuter station is named after the town of Tiroi, and is essentially a replacement of the old Tiroi station destroyed by communists during the 1948-1960 Malayan Emergency.

The station strictly serves as a two-platform train halt for the Seremban Line KTM Komuter train service, having prepared facilities to purchase tickets. The station's ticket counter is typically empty, leaving the halt's ticket vending machines to provide any services to passengers. The station, as are virtually all small train halts along the Komuter lines, is situated along two lanes of railroad (two basic routes) designated for trains traveling northbound or southbound. The station is one of a number of Komuter stations that serves very few passengers, but is slowly increasing due to new residential property developments nearby the area, such as Bandar Ainsdale.

See also
 Rail transport in Malaysia

References

Railway stations in Negeri Sembilan
Seremban Line